The 2006–07 season is Hyderabad cricket team's 73rd competitive season. The Hyderabad cricket team is senior men's domestic cricket team based in the city of Hyderabad, India, run by the Hyderabad Cricket Association. They represent the region of Telangana in the state of Andhra Pradesh in domestic competitions.

Competition Overview

Squads
 Head Coach : Vivek Jaisimha
 Bowling Coach : Kanwaljit Singh 

Rayudu and Suman returned to the Hyderabad from the Andhra while Jaisimha replaced Rajesh Yadav as the head coach of the Hyderabad ahead of the 2006–07 season.

NKP Salve Challenger Trophy
Laxman got picked to the India Green squad for the 2006-07 NKP Salve Challenger Trophy, a List-A cricket tournament in India. But, Laxman had to pull out of the tournament owing to the hamstring injury and was replaced on the eve of the first game.

 Irani Cup
Ojha got selected to the Rest of India squad for the 2006 Irani Cup, a first-class cricket competition in India.

Duleep Trophy
Laxman, Rayudu, Ojha, Khaleel and Arjun Yadav got selected to the South Zone squad for the 2006-07 Duleep Trophy, a first-class cricket tournament in India.

Deodhar Trophy
Laxman, Ojha and Arjun got selected to the South Zone squad for the 2006-07 Deodhar Trophy, a List-A cricket competition in India.

Ranji Trophy

The Hyderabad team, led by V. V. S. Laxman, began their campaign in the Ranji Trophy, the premier first-class cricket tournament in India, with a draw against the Maharashtra at Karad on 23 November 2006. After failure in the first two matches medium-pacer, Narender Pal Singh announced his retirement from the first-class cricket following his 13-year stint with the Hyderabad. Laxman missed after two games as he got selected to the India team for the tour to the South Africa. Anirudh Singh replaced Laxman as the captain for the rest of the tournament. They finished third in Group B of the Super League and failed to advance to the knockout stage with two wins, a loss and three draws.

Points Table
Super League Group B

  Top two teams advanced to the knockout stage.
  Bottom team relegated to the Plate League for the 2007–08 Ranji Trophy.
 Points system : Win by an innings or 10 wickets = 5, Win = 4, Draw with first innings lead = 2, No Result = 2, Draw with first innings deficit = 0, Loss = 0.

Matches
Group Stage

Statistics
Most runs

 Source: Cricinfo
Most wickets

 Source: Cricinfo

Ranji One–Day Trophy
The Hyderabad, led by V. V. S. Laxman, began their campaign in the Subbaiah Pillai Trophy as part of the South Zone Ranji One–Day Trophy, a List-A cricket tournament in India, with a win against the Goa at Hyderabad on 10 February 2007. The Hyderabad suffered an early set-back but the half-centuries from Laxman and Arjun Yadav helped the Hyderabad recover to 236 which proved to be more than enough as three-wicket haul from Kaushik Reddy and two-wicket hauls from Alfred Absolem and Pragyan Ojha ensured a 49-run win against the Goa. In the second match, the tight-bowling from the Tamil Nadu bowlers helped them to restrict the Hyderabad to 188 despite the half-century from Laxman while the half-centuries from Anirudha Srikkanth and Hemang Badani ensured the Tamil Nadu an eight-wicket win. Laxman pulled himself out of the tournament after two matches citing personal reasons. Anirudh Singh replaced him as the captain for the rest of the tournament. The pull-out of Laxman from the squad immediately affected the Hyderabad as they failed to chase the target of 232 set by the Andhra in their third match as Ambati Rayudu's 40 was the only score to cross 20 while Doddapaneni Kalyankrishna was the most effective bowler for the Andhra with three-wickets to his name. Earlier, the half-century from Manoj Sai provided a strong start for the Andhra though they were pulled back by the three-wicket hauls by Ojha and Absolem in the middle. The Kerala pulled off a tie against the Hyderabad in the fourth match despite their middle-order collapse as VA Jagadeesh carried the bat with an unbeaten 95 to reach 225 with the support from Padmaja Manikantan and Vinan Nair. Earlier, the Hyderabad reached to 225 with the half-century from Shashank Nag and the cameos from Rayudu, Arjun Yadav and Anirudh. The Hyderabad lost to the Karnataka in their final group game as the three-wicket haul from Sunil Joshi and an all-round performance from Chandrashekar Raghu ensured a six-wicket win for the Karnataka. This loss eliminated the Hyderabad from the tournament as they finished fourth in the South Zone with a win, a tie and three losses.

Points Table
South Zone

Matches
Zonal Stage

Statistics
Most runs

 Source: Cricinfo
Most wickets

 Source: Cricinfo

Inter State Twenty–20 Tournament
The Hyderabad team, led by Anirudh Singh, began their campaign in the Inter State Twenty–20 Tournament, a maiden domestic Twenty20 cricket tournament in India, with a win against the Goa at Visakhapatnam on 3 April 2007. Playing their first-ever T-20 match, brisk scoring of Tirumalasetti Suman at the start and Ibrahim Khaleel at the end helped the Hyderabad post 158 in 20 overs despite the middle-order collapse while the three-wicket hauls from Inder Shekar Reddy and Amol Shinde ensured the Hyderabad a 21-run win against the Goa. In the second match, the half-century from Khaleel helped the Hyderabad recover from their top-order collapse to 132 but the collective effort from the Kerala batsmen ensured the Kerala chase the target with five-wicket to spare. The collective bowling effort from the Tamil Nadu and an unbeaten 40-run knock from Subramaniam Badrinath helped them to defeat the Hyderabad in the third match by six wickets. In the fourth match, an unbeaten half-century from Ambati Rayudu along with a 40-run knock from Doddapaneni Rushi Raj helped the Hyderabad post 184 while the run-outs at the start and five-wickets shared between Pragyan Ojha and Shivaji Yadav helped them bowl out the Andhra for 88. The Hyderabad lost to the Karnataka in their last zonal match as they finished fourth in the South Zone and failed to advance to the Group stage with two wins and three losses. The Hyderabad batting collapsed once again in this tournament posting only 131 in 20 overs as Dwaraka Ravi Teja and Shashank Nag were the only people to score above 20 while the batting contributions from Robin Uthappa, Chandrashekar Raghu and Deepak Chougule helped the Karnataka chase the target with six wickets to spare.

Points Table
South Zone

Matches
Zonal Stage

Statistics
Most runs

 Source: Cricinfo
Most wickets

 Source: Cricinfo

See also
 Hyderabad cricket team
 Hyderabad Cricket Association

References

External links
Hyderabad cricket team official site

Cricket in Hyderabad, India
Cricket in Telangana
Sport in Telangana